Sandra Tabatha Cicero is an American esoteric writer and lecturer, best known for her work in the field of Hermeticism.

Early life
Born in rural Wisconsin in 1959, Cicero graduated from the University of Wisconsin–Milwaukee with a Bachelor's Degree in Fine Arts in 1982.  She worked as an entertainer, typesetter, editor, commercial artist, and computer graphics illustrator. She met her husband Chic Cicero in the early 1980s.

Writings
Along with her husband, Cicero has co-authored several books on the Golden Dawn, Tarot, Kabbalah, and the Western mystery tradition including The Essential Golden Dawn, which won a Coalition of Visionary Resources (COVR) award in 2004 as one of the year's best titles in the field of magic. Together, the Ciceros have edited, annotated and added new material to recent editions of classic magical texts by Israel Regardie, including The Middle Pillar, A Garden of Pomegranates, The Philosopher's Stone, and The Tree of Life. At the encouragement of Israel Regardie she painted "The Golden Dawn Magical Tarot".

The Golden Dawn
Cicero is a Rosicrucian and a Martinist, as well as the current Imperatrix of the Societas Rosicruciana in America (SRIAm). She was initiated into a modern Order in the tradition of the Hermetic Order of the Golden Dawn in 1983. Together, Cicero and her husband are two of the G.H. Chiefs of the contemporary Order of the same name, which claims initiatory lineage to the original Hermetic Order of the Golden Dawn through Israel Regardie.

Bibliography

Books
The New Golden Dawn Ritual Tarot. Cicero, Chic and Tabatha (1991). St. Paul, MN: Llewellyn Publications, 
Self-Initiation into the Golden Dawn Tradition. Cicero, Chic and Tabatha (1995).  St. Paul, MN: Llewellyn Publications, 
Experiencing the Kabbalah. Cicero, Chic and Tabatha (1997). St. Paul, MN: Llewellyn Publications, 
Creating Magical Tools. Cicero, Chic and Tabatha (1999). St. Paul, MN: Llewellyn Publications, 
Ritual Use of Magical Tools. Cicero, Chic and Tabatha (2000). St. Paul, MN: Llewellyn Publications, 
The Golden Dawn Magical Tarot. Cicero, Chic and Tabatha (2001). St. Paul, MN: Llewellyn Publications, 
The Essential Golden Dawn. Cicero, Chic and Tabatha (2003). St. Paul, MN: Llewellyn Publications, 
Secrets of a Golden Dawn Temple. Cicero, Chic and Tabatha (2004). Great Britain: Thoth, 
Tarot Talismans. Cicero, Chic and Tabatha (2006). Woodbury, MN: Llewellyn Publications, 
The Babylonian Tarot. Cicero, Sandra Tabatha. The Babylonian Tarot. (2006) Woodbury, MN: Llewellyn Publications, 
The Book of the Concourse of the Watchtowers. Cicero, Sandra Tabatha. (2012) Elfers, FL: HOGD Books,

Other
The Golden Dawn Journal: Book I: Divination. Cicero, Chic and Tabatha (1994). St. Paul, MN: Llewellyn Publications, 
The Golden Dawn Journal: Book II: Qabalah. Cicero, Chic and Tabatha (1994). St. Paul, MN: Llewellyn Publications, 
The Golden Dawn Journal: Book III: The Art of Hermes. Cicero, Chic and Tabatha (1995). St. Paul, MN: Llewellyn Publications, 
The Magical Pantheons: A Golden Dawn Journal. Cicero, Chic and Tabatha (1998).  St. Paul, MN: Llewellyn Publications, 
The Golden Dawn Enochian Skrying Tarot(co-authored with Bill & Judi Genaw)(2004). St. Paul, MN: Llewellyn Publications, 
Basics of Magic: The Best of the Golden Dawn Journal: Book I; Divination(2007). Elfers, FL: H.O.G.D. Books,

Notes

References 
Avalonia. Chic Cicero & Sandra Tabatha Cicero: Avalonia Author Interview
The Tarot Institute. Interview: Tabatha Cicero
Flight of Hermes. Interview: Sandra Tabatha Cicero

1959 births
Artists from Wisconsin
Writers from Wisconsin
Hermetic Order of the Golden Dawn
Living people
University of Wisconsin–Milwaukee alumni
Tarotologists